Borut Javornik (born 14 April 1967 in Krka) is a Yugoslav-born, Slovenian slalom canoeist who competed from the mid-1980s to the mid-1990s. He won a bronze medal in the C-1 team event at the 1989 ICF Canoe Slalom World Championships in Savage River. He also finished 16th in the C-1 event at the 1992 Summer Olympics in Barcelona.

References
 Sports-reference.com profile

1967 births
Canoeists at the 1992 Summer Olympics
Living people
Olympic canoeists of Slovenia
Slovenian male canoeists
Yugoslav male canoeists
Medalists at the ICF Canoe Slalom World Championships